Baano TV was a commercial television station operated by Baano Media Group in Afghanistan. Launched in July 2017, it became one of the first terrestrial TV stations in the country dedicated to women.

Baano TV was available in the Kabul, Parwan, Kapisa, Logar and Maidan Wardak provinces of Afghanistan, and they started their transmission in Mazar-e-sharif in August 2018.

In September 2018, the channel also started their transmission on Al Yah Satellite Communications.

Baano Media Group also operate an FM radio station for women under the name of Baano FM (Women FM).

After Taliban take power the channel was end its operations as dedicated women media group in 15 Aug 2021.

References

Television stations in Afghanistan
Women in Afghanistan
Television channels and stations established in 2017
2017 establishments in Afghanistan